Frank Harte (14 May 1933 – 27 June 2005) was a traditional Irish singer, song collector, architect and lecturer. He was born in Chapelizod, County Dublin, and raised in Dublin. His father, Peter Harte, who had moved from a farming background in Sligo, owned 'The Tap' pub in Chapelizod.

Harte emigrated to the United States for a short period, but returned to Ireland where he worked as an architect, lecturer at DIT (Dublin Institute of Technology) in Rathmines, Dublin before concentrating fully on singing and collecting songs.

Singing
Harte's introduction to Irish traditional singing came, he said, from a chance listening to an itinerant who was selling ballad sheets at a fair in Boyle, County Roscommon, sing "The Valley of Knockanure":

Harte became a great exponent of the Dublin street ballad, which he preferred to sing unaccompanied. He was widely known for his distinctive singing, his Dublin accent having a rich nasal quality complementing his often high register. His voice mellowed considerably by the time of his later recordings, allowing for an expressive interpretation of many love songs such as 'Bonny Light Horseman' on the album 'My Name is Napoleon Bonaparte'. This is contrasted sublimely by Frank's cogent interpretation of the popular 'Molly Malone'. He also became more accustomed to singing with accompaniment which is not strictly part of the Irish singing tradition and did not come naturally to him.

Though Irish Republican in his politics, he believed that the Irish song tradition need not be a sectarian or nationalist preserve: "The Orange song is just as valid an expression as the Fenian". He believed that songs were a key to understanding the past often saying: "those in power write the history, while those who suffer write the songs, and, given our history, we have an awful lot of songs." Though considered a stalwart of traditional Irish singing and well aware of it, Harte did not consider himself to be a sean-nós singer.

He claimed he liked to sing out of his love for a song rather than a desire to please an audience: "A traditional singer is not singing for a commercial audience so he doesn't have to please an audience." His repertoire included, amongst many others, songs of the 1798 rebellion, Napoleonic ballads and the street ballads of Zozimus. As well as traditional songs, he also sang numerous music hall songs such 'The Charladies' Ball' and 'Biddy Mulligan' as popularised by Jimmy O'Dea.

Harte won the All-Ireland Fleadh Cheoil singing competition on a number of occasions and in 2003, he received the Traditional Singer of the Year award from the Irish-language television channel TG4.

Song collecting
Harte began collecting early in life and he remembered buying ballads from a man who sold them by the sheet at the side of the Adelphi Cinema and by the end of his life had assembled a database of over 15,500 recordings.

As a young man, Harte encountered many songs in his father's pub, 'The Tap', in Chapelizod saying:

He once wrote about his song collecting:

This was a philosophy that Frank went on to espouse greatly himself, having given countless songs and encouragement to singers in Ireland and abroad for over fifty years. Recipients of songs and information about them include Christy Moore, Andy Irvine, Karan Casey, The Voice Squad, and musicians alike.

Despite his extensive collecting, he firmly believed that songs only existed when sung and to augment the point, he often quoted the poem "Living Ghosts" by Brendan Kennelly:

Harte is mentioned as a source of songs by members of Planxty:

Recordings
Harte recorded several albums and made numerous television and radio appearances, most notably the Singing Voices series he wrote and presented for RTÉ Radio, which was produced by Peter Browne in 1987. Harte's first two LPs, though released with six years between them, were recorded in one session in England by Bill Leader with concertina accompaniment on some songs by Alf Edwards. From 1998 he recorded four albums for the Hummingbird record label on which he was accompanied by Dónal Lunny on bouzouki and guitar. These last four albums covered the huge topics of the 1798 Rebellion, the Great Irish Famine, Napoleon Bonaparte and the Irish navvies abroad. Each album is characteristically accompanied by comprehensive liner notes of meticulous research into each song and the subject in question, though his accuracy and impartiality as a historian is not as unanimously praised as his singing. In 2004, Harte's first two albums were re-released on CD, though the first track of his first album 'Traveller All Over The World' was omitted.

Performance
Harte was a regular at the Sunday morning sessions at The Brazen Head pub, along with the late Liam Weldon who ran the session. He was also a supporter of An Góilín Traditional Singer's Club. A regular at singers' sessions in Ireland, he appeared at clubs, seminars and festivals in France, Britain and America as well as touring the festivals at Fleadhanna in Ireland. Harte also performed in London in Ewan MacColl and Peggy Seeger's 'Singers Club' in 1971 and at the on two occasions.

Harte felt that the traditional singer, unlike the latter type of vocalist, had absolutely no responsibility to entertain or please the crowd that might be listening, because the singer's real purpose is simply to perform the song, the act of the performance being a justification in itself.

He appeared at many American festivals including The Blarney Star in New York, Gaelic Roots in Boston College, The Catskills Irish Arts Week, The Greater Washington Ceili Club Festival in Maryland and Irish Fest in Milwaukee and for seventeen years he was a veritable staple at the Irish Week every July in the Augusta Heritage Festival in Elkins in the Appalachian mountains of West Virginia where he often performed with Mick Moloney. He was also in demand as a teacher and gave many talks about traditional song including a lecture entitled "My name is Napoleon Bonaparte – the significance of Napoleon Bonaparte in the Irish Song Tradition" at the Willy Clancy Summer school on 12 July 2001.

Legacy
Harte died of a heart attack, aged 72, on 27 June 2005 and is survived by his wife Stella (née Maguire), daughters, Sinead and Orla, and his sons Darragh and Cian. His influence is still evident in singers such as Karan Casey. Frank continues to be remembered fondly in sessions and folk clubs on both sides of the Irish sea.

At the 2005 Whitby Folk Week a tribute to Frank Harte entitled "Through Streets Broad and Narrow" was held at the
Resolution Hotel Function Room, on Monday 22 August 2005 at 6:00pm. It featured Ken Hall and Peta Webb, Jim McFarland, Niamh Parsons, Jerry O'Reilly, Jim Mageean, George Unthank, Alan Fitzsimons, Pete Wood, Grace Toland, Brian Doyle, Patricia Flynn, Geordie McIntyre and Alison McMorland, The Wilsons, Eamonn O'Broithe, Roisin White, Bruce Scott, Rosie Stewart and others.

In September 2006, the first Frank Harte Festival was organised and held in Dublin by Jerry O'Reilly and other members of An Góilín Traditional Singer's Club. The second and third festivals were held in September 2007 and 2008, again organised by An Góilín, and the festival has continued as an annual event taking place on the last weekend of September each year. As part of the festival, a walk takes place around an area of Dublin associated with Frank's songs. In 2011 it was in Glasnevin cemetery. In 2012 it was based on central Dublin, around Trinity College.

Singer-songwriter Robbie O'Connell wrote a song "The Keeper of the Songs" in memory of Harte.

In May 2008, the third Frank Harte Memorial Prize was given at the Dublin Institute of Technology, Bolton Street, in association with the DIT faculty of the built environment, RTÉ, and the Teachers' Union of Ireland. The prize is awarded to students in their second year of their studies in Construction Technology and Design.

Discography

Solo albums 
 Dublin Street Songs (Topic, 1967)
 Through Dublin City (Topic, 1973)
 And Listen to My Song (Mulligan/Ram, 1978)
 Daybreak and a Candle-End (Faetain, 1987)
 1798 - The First Year of Liberty (Hummingbird, 1998)
 My Name Is Napoleon Bonaparte: Traditional Songs on Napoleon Bonaparte (Hummingbird, 2001)
 The Hungry Voice: The Song Legacy of Ireland's Great Hunger (Hummingbird, 2004)
 Dublin Street Songs / Through Dublin City (Hummingbird, 2004) – first two albums reissued on combined CD
 There's Gangs of Them Digging: Songs of Irish Labour (Hummingbird, 2007)
 When Adam Was in Paradise, Traditional Songs of Love and Courtship (Hummingbird, 2016)

Compilations 
 Top of the Morning (Pickwick, 1979) – includes Harte's "Biddy Mulligan"
 Irish Folk Favourites (Harp/Pickwick, 1990) – includes Harte's "Dicey Reilly"
 Irish Voices (Topic, 1996) – includes Harte's "The Traveller All Over the World"
 Irish Songs From Old New England (Folk Legacy, 2003) – includes Harte's "Napoleon's Defeat"
 Three Score and Ten (Topic, 2009) – includes Harte's "He Rolled her to the Wall"

Bibliography

Broadcast
 Singing Voices, five-part series for RTÉ Radio 1 first broadcast in May 1987 each on a different aspect of the Irish singing tradition.
 Appearance on Come West Along the Road series one singing "Napoleon Bonaparte" originally from the RTÉ series Fonn
 Main subject of the television documentary Sé Mo Laoch – Frank Harte for TG4, directed by Philip King
 Main subject of the memorial radio documentary And Listen to my Song by Peter Browne for RTÉ Radio. Listen to it here.
 Main subject of a radio documentary called Frank Harte Remembered by Mick Moloney on RTÉ Radio a year after his death. Listen to it here.

See also
 List of Irish music collectors

References

Obituaries
 O'Reilly, Jerry: "Frank Harte (1933–2005)", in: Folk Music Journal vol. 9, no. 3 (2008), pp. 479–80.
 Ní Fhloinn, Bairbre: "In Memoriam. Frank Harte – Singer and Song-Collector 1933–2005", in: Béaloideas'' vol. 74 (2006), pp. 236–8.

External links
 RTÉ Radio Series 'Singing Voices' 1987
 Interview with Luke Cheevers about the impending first Frank Harte Festival on RTÉ Radio programme, 'The Rolling Wave' on 20 September 2006 (17'30" in)
 
 
 Review of Napoleon album
 Video of Frank Harte's lecture at the Kennedy Centre in 2000

1933 births
2005 deaths
20th-century Irish male singers
Irish folk singers
Musicians from County Dublin
Topic Records artists